"L'eccezione" is a song by Italian rapper and singer Madame. It was produced by Dardust and Luca Faraone, and released on 15 April 2022 by Sugar Music.

The song was included in the original soundtrack of Amazon Prime Video's series Bang Bang Baby.

Personnel
Credits adapted from Tidal.
 Dardust – producer
 Luca Faraone – producer and composer
 Madame – associated performer, author, vocals

Charts

Certifications

References

2022 songs
2022 singles
Madame (singer) songs
Sugar Music singles